Tinguiririca is a Chilean town in the commune of Chimbarongo in Colchagua Province, O'Higgins Region.

See also
 List of towns in Chile

Populated places in Colchagua Province